Dante Schietroma (14 October 1917 – 7 September 2004) was an Italian politician.

His son, Gian Franco Schietroma, also undertook a political career in the PSDI, becoming its national secretary.

Biography
Schietroma was a member of the Italian Democratic Socialist Party (PSDI). He was Senator from 1963 to 1987. He served as Minister of Public Function in the cabinets led by Prime Ministers Giovanni Spadolini (1981–1982) and Amintore Fanfani (1982–1983).

He was also he was municipal councilor of Frosinone from 1956 to 1995, serving as its Mayor from 1988 to 1989.

For six years, from 1988 to 1994, he was a member of the Presidential Council of the Court of Audit.

References

1917 births
2004 deaths
People from the Province of Frosinone
Italian Democratic Socialist Party politicians
Government ministers of Italy
Senators of Legislature IV of Italy
Senators of Legislature V of Italy
Senators of Legislature VI of Italy
Senators of Legislature VII of Italy
Senators of Legislature VIII of Italy
Senators of Legislature IX of Italy
Politicians of Lazio
Mayors of Frosinone